Bareqin Khunsorkh (also Romanized as Bāreqīn Khūnsorkh; also known as Bāreqīn) is a village in Gachin Rural District, in the Central District of Bandar Abbas County, Hormozgan Province, Iran. At the 2006 census, its population was 236, in 60 families.

References 

Populated places in Bandar Abbas County